Wlaschiha is a Germanized version of Czech surname Vlačiha. Notable people with the surname include:

 Ekkehard Wlaschiha (1938–2019), German operatic baritone
 Tom Wlaschiha (born 1973), German actor and voice actor

German-language surnames
Surnames of Czech origin